Ore Oru Gramathiley is a 1987 Indian Tamil-language drama film directed by K. Jyothi Pandian. The film stars Lakshmi and Nizhalgal Ravi. Based on the play Gandhi Gramam by Vaali, it revolves around a collector who manipulates her caste certificate to get a government job.

The film became controversial for criticising caste based reservations, but was later cleared for release by the Supreme Court of India following changes in the climax, and won the National Film Award for Best Film on Other Social Issues.

Plot

Cast 
Lakshmi as Gayathri/Karuppayi
Nizhalgal Ravi
Poornam Viswanathan as Shankara Sastri
Charle
V. K. Ramasamy
Vinu Chakravarthy
Delhi Ganesh
Senthil
Kamala Kamesh
Manorama

Production
The film was an adaptation of the stage play Gandhi Gramam by Vaali.

Soundtrack 
Soundtrack was composed by Ilaiyaraaja.

Reception 
C. V. Aravind of The Indian Express praised the film for having a "novel theme", but said the comedy track was "not up to the mark".

Controversies 
Ore Oru Gramathiley was initially banned for criticising caste based reservations. The Supreme Court of India later allowed its release, after the producer agreed to make changes in the climax. After it won the National Film Award for Best Film on Other Social Issues, a writ plea to have the award nullified was made in the High Court. The plaintiff argued that the conferment of the award should be deemed "illegal" since the film was screened for the jury even before the ban was lifted by the Supreme Court. Ultimately, his efforts were fruitless.

See also 
List of films banned in India

References

External links 

1980s Tamil-language films
1989 films
Best Film on Other Social Issues National Film Award winners
Films scored by Ilaiyaraaja
Indian films based on plays
Works about reservation in India